Paul Bannon (born 22 March 1954) is a Canadian long-distance runner. He won bronze medal in the marathon at the 1978 Commonwealth Games.

Bannon grew up in Scotland and was a promising junior athlete. In 1973 he accepted an athletics scholarship at Memphis State University where in 1991 he was honored in the Memphis Tigers hall of fame.

Bannon moved to Toronto, Ontario, Canada in 1976  and became a member of the Toronto Olympic Club. In May 1978 he finished second in the Ottawa Marathon in a time of 2:16:03.2 and within a stride of Brian Maxwell.
This was quickly followed by breaking the Canadian record for 20 km, finishing in a time of 1:01:06 in Chicago.

Bannon was selected for the 1978 Commonwealth Games marathon in Edmonton, Canada. He won a bronze medal behind winner Gidamis Shahanga and fellow Canadian Jerome Drayton. Five years later
he went on to win the Vancouver Marathon which was long due to misdirection. 

He is now a religion teacher in Mississauga.

Achievements

References

External links
 

1954 births
Living people
Canadian male long-distance runners
Canadian male marathon runners
Athletes (track and field) at the 1978 Commonwealth Games
Commonwealth Games medallists in athletics
Commonwealth Games bronze medallists for Canada
Medallists at the 1978 Commonwealth Games